The Sustainable Stock Exchanges (SSE) initiative promoting corporate investment in sustainable development. It is a project of the United Nations (UN) co-organized by the United Nations Conference on Trade and Development (UNCTAD), the United Nations Global Compact, the United Nations Environment Programme Finance Initiative (UNEP-FI) and the UN-supported Principles for Responsible Investment (PRI).

Other key stakeholders include the World Federation of Exchanges (WFE), and the International Organization of Securities Commissions (IOSCO). The SSE provides a multi-stakeholder learning platform for stock exchanges, investors, regulators, and companies.

History

The first meeting of the SSE was opened by UN Secretary-General Ban Ki-Moon in New York City in 2009. Subsequently, the SSE began holding "Global Dialogues" every two years, starting with the 2010 SSE Global Dialogue in Xiamen, China, which took place as part of the UNCTAD World Investment Forum. The second SSE Global Dialogue was held in 2012 in Rio de Janeiro, Brazil, as part of the Global Compact Corporate Sustainability Forum.

At the SSE 2012 Global Dialogue a new dimension to the Initiative was launched, with the five participating stock exchanges making a voluntary public commitment to sustainability in their markets, thereby becoming a SSE Partner Exchange. Since the event, several other leading exchanges have joined the group of SSE Partner Exchanges. UNCTAD, the UN Global Compact, the PRI and UNEP-FI, as the core organizer of the SSE Initiative, also committed to supporting stock exchanges in this effort.

The SSE initiative invites exchanges globally to become a Partner Stock Exchange within the SSE by making a voluntary public commitment to promote improved ESG disclosure and performance among listed companies. In addition, the SSE welcomes participation from securities regulators, investors, companies and other key stakeholders within its Consultative Group. The PRI has an SSE Investor Working Group that has been actively engaged since 2009. The SSE's flagship event is its biennial Global Dialogues and it continues to develop new work streams to address specific stakeholder requests.

SSE Global Dialogues
The Sustainable Stock Exchanges Global Dialogues are held every two years as the SSE initiative's flagship event. They provide a unique, high-level platform to explore how the world's exchanges can work together with investors, regulators and companies to create more sustainable capital markets. They are designed to analyze, promote and foster communication on stock exchanges’ sustainability-related activities. They demonstrate the progress of stock exchanges, while highlighting challenges and opportunities ahead. Another core purpose is to facilitate the sharing of experiences that encourage exchanges and their regulators to enhance listing rules and/or regulatory initiatives to include the disclosure of sustainability strategies by listed companies.

The 2014 Global Dialogue was held in Geneva, Switzerland, on 14 October 2014, at the United Nations Palais de Nations. The focus of this event was "Capital Markets for Sustainable Development." It featured over 30 high-level roundtable speakers, consisting of CEOs and Chairmen of Stock Exchanges, investors, companies and standard setters, as well as capital market regulators and policy makers. This event was held as part of the four-day UNCTAD biennial World Investment Forum from October 13 to 17.
 
The 2012 Global Dialogue was held on 18 June 2012 in Rio de Janeiro, Brazil. It focused on the role of the world's stock exchanges in encouraging responsible, long-term investment and creating sustainable financial markets. The event took place in the days leading up to the United Nations Conference on Sustainable Development (Rio+20) as part of the UN Global Compact’s Corporate Sustainability Forum (CSF).

The 2010 Global Dialogue was held on 8 September 2010 in Xiamen, China. It took place against the backdrop of UNCTAD's World Investment Forum and the China International Fair for Investment and Trade (CIFIT) which brought together 1,500 leaders from various stakeholder groups including governments, businesses, international organizations, investment promotion agencies, civil society, and international investment experts and practitioners from across the world.

The 2009 Global Dialogue was held on 2 November 2009. More than 100 top executives from around the world met at UN Headquarters in New York to explore how the world's exchanges can work together with investors, regulators, and companies to enhance corporate transparency, and ultimately performance, on environmental, social and corporate governance (ESG) issues and encourage responsible long-term approaches to investment.

SSE Regional Dialogues

The SSE partners with exchanges, investors and other capital market leaders worldwide to bring capital market players together to identify, discuss and take collective action on common sustainability issues pertinent for their region or globally. These high-level events are open to the public and bring exchanges together with policy makers, regulators, investors, companies and other relevant stakeholders.

For the SSE Regional Dialogue: LatAm & Caribbean, Latin America's four largest stock exchanges gathered in Colombia for the first Sustainable Stock Exchanges (SSE) Regional Dialogue: LatAm & Caribbean.  The regional version of the flagship SSE Global Dialogue was facilitated by the SSE, hosted by the Colombian Securities Exchange (BVC), and sponsored by the Latin American Sustainable Investment Forum (LatinSIF).

The SSE Regional Dialogue: South East Asia was held on 18 May 2015. The Sustainable Stock Exchanges Regional Dialogue South East Asia kicked off in the heart of Bangkok, Thailand with the participation of more than 150 delegates from 13 countries. The SSE Regional Dialogue, as the first of its kind in South East Asia, offered a unique platform for CEO's of stock exchanges, listed companies and institutional investors, along with high-level policy makers and regulators, to demonstrate leadership and understanding of the sustainable development opportunities and challenges facing capital markets today.

Afternoon workshop sessions were made possible through the support of collaborating partners GRI (Global Reporting Initiative), CDSB (Climate Disclosure Standards Board), ASRIA (Asia Investment Group on Climate Change) and MSCI.

During the Regional Dialogue, leaders of the Hanoi, Hochiminh and Malaysia Stock Exchanges announced their public Commitments to join the SSE initiative as SSE Partner Exchanges.

The SSE Regional Dialogue: Nordic Countries began on 4 November 2015. The Sustainable Stock Exchanges Regional Dialogue: Nordic Countries took place in Helsinki, Finland. The SSE Regional Dialogue, the first of its kind in the region, offered a unique platform for CEO's of stock exchanges, listed companies and institutional investors, alongside high-level policy makers and regulators, to demonstrate leadership and understanding of the sustainable development opportunities and challenges facing capital markets today.

Hosted by Nasdaq Helsinki, the SSE Regional Dialogue welcomed more than 100 participants from across Nordic markets. A high-level policy dialogue took place in the morning of 4 November, followed in the afternoon by practical workshops to assist investors, companies and other capital market stakeholders with integrating sustainable development into investment and business strategies.

Eight new exchanges joined the SSE initiative at the SSE Regional Dialogue: Nordic Countries.

SSE Leaders Luncheons

The SSE partners with exchanges, investors, and other capital market leaders worldwide to bring capital market players together to identify, discuss and take collective action on common sustainability issues alongside key events and UN summits. These high-level events bring exchanges together with policy makers, regulators, investors, companies and other relevant stakeholders for candid conversations aimed at collectively problem solving key issues, challenges and opportunities facing capital markets today.

The SSE Leaders Luncheon: SDGs is held on the eve of the launch of the Sustainable Development Goals (SDGs) to bring together capital market leaders to discuss the role they can play in supporting the achievement of these goals. This high-level dialogue included CEOs from SSE Partner Exchanges, institutional investors and listed companies, joining public policy leaders from international organizations and national governments. All participants had an opportunity to speak and engage with their peers on the critical question of how markets can support sustainable development. The SSE Leaders Luncheon helped to set the agenda for how capital market actors can support the SDGs in the coming years. From sustainability reporting and mobilizing finance to gender equality and global partnerships, stock markets have an important role to play in promoting good corporate practices and facilitating investment in sustainable development.

The SSE Leaders Luncheon: Climate was held in December 2015. World leaders gathered for the 2015 United Nations Climate Change Conference (COP21) to complete a new global agreement. This summit caps a year that has seen numerous momentous international breakthroughs, from the G20 pact on climate policy to the China-USA Joint Presidential Announcement on Climate Change. As climate plays an increasingly prominent role in the development of investment policy and regulation, it also has a growing impact on capital markets, investors and corporations. COP21 set the stage for a new generation of global climate change policies that will influence markets for years to come.

This peer-to-peer CEO summit provided a platform for addressing climate challenges and opportunities and sharing views on the path forward. Hosted by Mirova and Natixis, this United Nations event welcomed an exclusive group of C-level participants from stock exchanges, institutional investors, and listed companies joining public policy leaders from international organizations, national governments and regulatory bodies.

Partner exchanges

References

United Nations Environment Programme